The Municipal District of Badlands No. 7 was a municipal district in southern Alberta, Canada. It existed for seven years between 1991 and 1998 prior to its amalgamation with the former City of Drumheller to create the current Town of Drumheller.

History 
The former Municipal District (MD) of Badlands No. 7 was originally established on January 1, 1991 when Improvement District No. 7 incorporated as a municipal district. Seven years later on January 1, 1998, the former MD of Badlands No. 7 and the former City of Drumheller amalgamated with each other to form the current Town of Drumheller.

Demographics 

In the 2001 Census, the dissolved MD of Badlands No. 7 had a population of 1,282, a 2.9% change from its 1996 population of 1,246.

See also 
List of communities in Alberta
List of municipal districts in Alberta

References

External links 
Municipal District of Badlands No. 7 Incorporation Act

1991 establishments in Alberta
1988 disestablishments in Alberta
Populated places disestablished in 1998
Drumheller
Badlands No. 7